Natalya Filonich is a Soviet sprint canoer who competed in the early 1980s. She won a silver medal in the K-4 500 m event at the 1981 ICF Canoe Sprint World Championships in Nottingham.

References

Living people
Soviet female canoeists
Year of birth missing (living people)
Russian female canoeists
ICF Canoe Sprint World Championships medalists in kayak